Czech Canadians are Canadian citizens of Czech ancestry or Czech-born people who reside in Canada. They were frequently called Bohemian Canadians until the late 19th century. According to the 2006 Canadian census, there were 98,090 Canadians of full or partial Czech descent.

Number of Czech and Czechoslovak Canadians
Data from this section from Statistics Canada, 2016.

Notable people 
 Karla Homolka - serial killer
 Vasek Pospisil - tennis player
 Jenna Talackova - model, TV personality
 Otto Jelinek - businessman, former figure skater, politician
 Thomas J. Bata - businessman, "Shoemaker to the World"
 Josef Škvorecký - writer, publisher
 Ivan Reitman - director
 David Nykl - actor
 Vaclav Smil - scientist and policy analyst
 Karina Gould - politician
 Travis Konecny - hockey player

See also

 Demographics of the Czech Republic
 Canada–Czech Republic relations
 Czech people
 European Canadians

Further reading
Encyclopedia of Canada's Peoples. "Czechs:Origins.". Multicultural Canada.

References

European Canadian
 
Canada
Canada